Penaten is a German brand of healthcare products, including baby cream (barrier cream) owned by Johnson & Johnson.

Its name is taken from the Penates, the household deities of Ancient Rome.

The Penaten Cream was developed by German chemist Max Riese in 1904. The production was based in a factory built in 1908 in Rhöndorf which was destroyed during the Second World War. It was rebuilt by Riese's sons Max and Alfred. 

In 1986 Penaten became part of the Johnson & Johnson company. In 2000, the production of the cream was moved to Italy and France.

J&J now sells petroleum jelly in tubes that hold the same name as the original medicinal zinc cream: “PENATEN”.  This is a completely different product and cannot be used as advised/prescribed by doctors, who are intending for patients to use the original zinc product.

References

Health care companies of Germany
Johnson & Johnson brands